Papyrus 93 (in the Gregory-Aland numbering), designated by 𝔓93, is a copy of the New Testament in Greek. It is a papyrus manuscript of the Gospel of John. The surviving texts of John are verses 13:15-17. The manuscript paleographically has been assigned to the middle 5th century.

 Text 
The Greek text of this manuscript is a representative of the Alexandrian text-type. It has not yet been placed in Aland's Categories of New Testament manuscripts.

 Location 
The manuscript is currently housed at the Girolamo Vitelli Papyrological Institute (PSI Inv. 108) at National Archaeological Museum in Florence.

See also 

 List of New Testament papyri

References

Further reading 

 Guido Bastianini, Trenta testi greci da Papiri letterari e documentari, a cura di M. Manfredi, no. 4 (Florence: 1983), pp. 10–11.

New Testament papyri
5th-century biblical manuscripts
National Archaeological Museum, Florence
Gospel of John papyri